Léman Manhattan Preparatory School is a private school located in the Financial District of Manhattan, New York City. The school serves students from early childhood (age 24 months) through 12th grade at two campuses in Lower Manhattan. Founded as Claremont Preparatory School in 2005, it was renamed in 2015.

In 2010, Léman became one of 10 schools in the Meritas Family of Schools, an international network of college preparatory schools, and became an affiliate school of Nord Anglia Education in 2015. , tuition for K-12 day students averages $50,850 per year, while the boarding tuition is $91,000 per year.

Léman Manhattan Preparatory School enrolls students representing more than 70 countries of origin. It is the only high school in New York City with a residential boarding program, and  enrolls more than 100 boarding students representing 20 countries.

Curriculum
Each student at Léman Manhattan in grades K through 12 receives a Personal Learning Plan (PLP). The PLP guides students as they progress through the academic year by focusing on the students' strengths, documenting areas of growth, and identifying special passions.

In 2014, Léman Manhattan became one of four private schools in Manhattan to offer the International Baccalaureate (IB) Diploma, recognized worldwide. In 2014, students participated in an immersion program with its sister campus near Geneva, Switzerland, Collège du Léman.

International boarding

In 2012, Léman Manhattan opened its boarding program. After evaluating hundreds of applications, the school accepted forty students from nine countries and three continents to grades 9-12 in its inaugural program.  Students are fully immersed with the day student population with English Language Learning support. In 2015, Léman had over 100 students participating in its boarding program.

Campus
Léman Manhattan's middle and high school campuses are located in the Cunard Building (1 Morris Street) in the Financial District of Manhattan, New York City, and opened in 2010. The lower school (41 Broad Street) is blocks away in the former headquarters of Bank of America International, and was the original campus. Both campuses have their own swimming pools, art studios, libraries, gyms, music rooms, cafeterias and fine arts performing spaces.  The Lower School has a rooftop playground.

Student housing is located at 37 Wall Street, a luxury apartment building blocks away from the Upper School Campus. Students live in newly renovated apartments, with rooms accommodating 2-4 people. Every suite has its own kitchen, bathroom, study area, Wi-Fi and security system. Student housing also includes a 24/7 security presence in addition to around-the-clock surveillance by the school's Residential Life staff.

Accreditation
Léman Manhattan Preparatory School is a fully independent, non-sectarian school. The school is accredited by the Middle States Association of Colleges and Schools.

Sister schools

Léman Manhattan has two sister schools, Léman International School Chengdu, China and Collège du Léman in Geneva, Switzerland.

References

Further reading 
 Chura, Hillary. "The Power Of A Global Education" (Archive). New York Family. January 20, 2015.

Educational institutions established in 2011
Private K-12 schools in Manhattan
Financial District, Manhattan
2011 establishments in New York City